Caryocolum dauphini is a moth of the family Gelechiidae. It is found in the south-eastern Alps.

References

Moths described in 2012
dauphini
Moths of Europe